Orenjë is a village and a former municipality in the Elbasan County, eastern Albania. At the 2015 local government reform it became a subdivision of the municipality Librazhd. The population at the 2011 census was 3,883. The municipal unit consists of the villages Ballegjin, Floq, Funares, Gurakuq, Mexixe, Neshte, Orenjë, Rinas, Zdrajsh and Zdrajsh Veri.

Notable people
 Hafiz Sabri Koçi - Albanian Grand Mufti

References

Former municipalities in Elbasan County
Administrative units of Librazhd
Villages in Elbasan County